All Saints Church is a Church of England church of 15th-century origin in Wyke Regis, Weymouth, Dorset, England. Built largely of Portland stone, the Royal Commission on the Historical Monuments of England have described the church as a "remarkably consistent and unchanged 15th-century design". It has been a Grade I listed building since 1953. Facing Wyke Road from the modern cemetery opposite the church is the Wyke Regis War Memorial, erected in 1919.

History
The present All Saints Church dates to the mid-15th-century, however a church has been recorded on the same site as early as 1172. The present building was completed in 1455 and re-consecrated on 19 October that year. All Saints was the original parish church of Weymouth until the 19th-century, when other churches were built to meet the growing population, including Holy Trinity Church, overlooking Weymouth Town Bridge, St Paul's Church in Westham and St Edmund's Church in Lanehouse.

Overlooking the Isle of Portland and Chesil Beach, the tower of the church was a prominent landmark for vessels during the age of sail. Within the cemetery are the unmarked graves of around eighty who died on board the Earl of Abergavenny, including the captain John Wordsworth, brother of the poet William Wordsworth. The ship sank in Weymouth Bay in 1805 after striking the Shambles Sandbank off of the Isle of Portland. Bodies recovered from the merchant vessel Alexander, wrecked in 1815, are also buried in the churchyard.

The church was reseated with new pews in 1859. Other improvements included the installation of a new pulpit and reading desk, and the removal of the church's gallery, which involved moving the organ to a platform under the tower. The work cost an estimated £500, £460 of which had already been raised by March 1859, when the plans were approved by the Weymouth vestry. The church reopened on 11 December 1859, with the morning sermon being preached by the Bishop of Salisbury, the Right Rev. Walter Kerr Hamilton, and the afternoon sermon preached by the rector, Rev. H. C. Pigon. A lych gate was added to the churchyard in 1896. It was erected by the builder Mr. J. Bishop to the designs of George Fellowes Prynne.

References

External links
 
 The Parish of Wyke Regis website

Buildings and structures in Weymouth, Dorset
Churches in Dorset
Church of England church buildings in Dorset
Grade I listed churches in Dorset
1455 establishments in England